Marivirga atlantica is a Gram-negative, aerobic and rod-shaped bacterium from the genus of Marivirga which has been isolated from seawater from the Atlantic Ocean.

References

Cytophagia
Bacteria described in 2015